Rags is a Nickelodeon Original Movie. It is a musical, gender-switched inversion and modernization of the Cinderella fairy tale, starring Keke Palmer, Max Schneider, Drake Bell, Avan Jogia and Nick Cannon. The film premiered on Nickelodeon on May 28, 2012.

The film was released as a DVD on August 28, 2012 as a double feature with Big Time Movie.

Plot 
Charlie Prince is an orphan living in his late mother's old karaoke bar, The Palace, willed to his acerbic and unloving stepfather Arthur. Arthur makes Charlie do most of the work cleaning the bar; the other employees, couple Diego and Martha, love Charlie like their own son while his stepbrothers, the selfish Andrew and the nicer but simple-minded Lloyd, only annoy him. All three boys dream of being singers, and while Andrew and Lloyd lack talent (which Arthur is blind to), Charlie is vocally talented and can write music, though he can't seem to catch a break. In the beginning, Charlie performs on the streets of New York City, and the narrator Shawn tips him, telling him, "Next time I see you, it better be on an album cover."

Kadee Worth, on the other hand, is the daughter of music mogul Reginald Worth, president of Majesty Records, and is an international pop phenomenon. While the world knows her as a glamorous superstar, she is secretly frustrated with singing other people's songs and wearing clothes other people choose for her. Just adding to her annoyance is her self-centered "boyfriend" Finn, who she is dating because her father believes it will help her sell records. Meanwhile, all Kadee wants is for the world to hear and see her true talent.

One day, Arthur sends Charlie to deliver his brothers' track "Androyd" to Majesty Records for their newly announced talent contest, and on the way, he bumps into Kadee after her dog, Trumpet, runs towards him. He drops off the disk, then notices a job offer as a janitor. Shawn, an employee of Majesty Records, sees him and tells the receptionist to make sure Charlie gets the job. Shortly after he's hired, Shawn catches Charlie singing in the studio and helps him record a demo. Throughout his employment, Charlie bumps into Kadee, slowly making enough of an impression on her that she starts following him, and meanwhile Arthur receives notice of Androyd's rejection from the talent contest.

Kadee finally talks to Charlie outside of work and reveals that she writes her own music, and Charlie takes Kadee into town and encourages her to sing. Wearing a thin but effective disguise, she performs one of her songs on the street and loves the experience. As thanks, she gives Charlie an invitation to Majesty Records' Masquerade Ball, where the company will announce the winner of the talent contest, but Arthur confiscates the invitation and uses it to take Androyd to the ball. With Diego and Martha's help, Charlie sneaks into the ball.

After dancing with Kadee in disguise, Charlie meets Shawn, the DJ of the party, who gives him a demo CD with the stage name "Rags" as a reminder of his humble origins. When the talent contest winner fails to appear at the ball as the planned musical act, Arthur seizes the opportunity to send Androyd up, but the crowd quickly boos them off. Shawn encourages Charlie to perform instead, and though hesitant, he agrees and steals the show, but hurries out immediately after as he sees his stepfamily departing. On the way out, he kisses Kadee, telling her again to "Be you," and accidentally drops his CD.

Kadee, desperate to find out who Rags was, asks her father to help her find him, but he doesn't listen, thinking that it wouldn't be a good business move. Unwilling to give up, Kadee tracks down Charlie at The Palace and asks him to help. Working up all of his nerve, Charlie attempts to confess his identity, but Kadee doesn't hear him, leading him to help with the search auditions; nobody else had heard the second song on the CD, so whoever knew the lyrics was Rags. When Reginald confronts Kadee, she berates him for not listening to her. Charlie inadvertently eavesdrops and walks away with the mistaken impression that Kadee has no interest in him, only for Kadee to compliment him immediately after and end her relationship with Finn. Lloyd, who recognized Charlie at his performance from the design of his shoes, encourages Charlie to go after her and promises to keep his secret.

Andrew overhears the conversation, goes through Charlie's room and steals his songbook, presenting it to Arthur. At the auditions, Reginald arrives and apologizes for ignoring Kadee, promising to be more receptive. Charlie also encourages Kadee, telling her again "Be you," to her surprise. Andrew shows up to audition and leads Charlie to his father, who locks him in a closet so that Andrew can pose as Rags, leaving Lloyd as just a backup singer. Arthur also reveals he intends to sell The Palace. Though Charlie escapes with the help of Trumpet and Kadee's girl friends, he arrives just in time to see Andrew shake hands with Reginald Worth.

Heartbroken, Charlie packs his things and plans to leave, but Kadee finds him and pleads with him to stay until she introduces Rags. To everyone's surprise, she calls up Charlie, having put together the pieces from him telling her to be herself. Ecstatic, Charlie begins to sing for the crowd, but soon invites Kadee up to the stage and tells her to sing her songs, which she does with her father's encouragement. Upon hearing his daughter's true talent, Reginald is astounded and gives Kadee charge of her career from that point on. Lloyd, fed up with his father and brother’s mistreatment, then reveals that Charlie's mom actually left The Palace to Charlie, not Arthur, which just adds to Charlie's day.

Charlie and Kadee start dating and appear on many covers of magazines. The movie ends with them singing "Me And You Against The World" at The Palace, now owned by Charlie and still managed by Diego and Martha, with Lloyd as a backup dancer, while Arthur and Andrew are made janitors as punishment for their actions towards Charlie.

Cast 
 Keke Palmer as Kadee Worth, a famous pop singer who befriends Charlie. She helps him with his dreams, and he helps her see what she really wants.
 Max Schneider as Charlie Prince, a talented, young musician with the hopes of being famous.
 Drake Bell as Shawn, a studio technician at Majesty Records who helps Charlie produce his demo CD that leads Kadee to Rags.
 Avan Jogia as Finn, Kadee's rockstar ex-boyfriend.
 Zak Santiago as Diego, a worker with Martha at Arthur's store and Charlie's father figure.
 Christina Sicoli as Martha, a worker with Diego at Arthur's store and Charlie's mother figure. 
Robert Moloney as Arthur McGowens, Charlie's horrible stepfather.
 Burkely Duffield as Lloyd McGowens, Charlie's nicer stepbrother, who has a crush on Kadee’s friend, Tammy. 
 Keenan Tracey as Andrew McGowens, Charlie's spoiled and selfish stepbrother.
 Isaiah Mustafa as Reginald Worth, Kadee's father.
 Nick Cannon as Himself
 Devon Weigel as Erna, Reginald Worth's assistant.
 Tracy Spiridakos as Sammi, Kadee's friend. 
 Carlena Britch as Tammy, Kadee's friend and backup dancer, who has a crush on Charlie’s stepbrother, Lloyd.
 Maggie Ma as the Majesty Records receptionist

Filming 
Filming took place in Vancouver, British Columbia, Canada from May to July 2011. The film premiered on Nickelodeon in the USA on Monday May 28, 2012.

Ratings 
The film received 3.5 million viewers, however it earned 4.6 million total viewers (Live + 7 day) becoming one of Nickelodeon's highest rated original films. As well, the film shot to the top of the iTunes sales charts, debuting as the #1 musical on iTunes and remaining atop the charts for more than a month.

The film received 139,000 on Nickelodeon in the United Kingdom and Ireland.

Home media
The film was released on DVD on August 28, 2012, together with Big Time Movie.

Soundtrack 

Rags (Music from the Original Movie) is a soundtrack album by the film of the same name, released on May 22, 2012 by Nickelodeon Records. All the songs was produced by Darkchild and Andre Lindal. It includes nine songs featured by Keke Palmer and Max Schneider, with three bonus tracks. It was released on May 21 on iTunes. The soundtrack has peaked at number one on the iTunes soundtrack albums chart and number three on the Top 100 albums on iTunes chart. "Me and You Against the World" was released as a promotional single on April 17, 2012.

Track listing

Charts

References

2010s musical comedy films
2010s teen comedy films
2012 television films
2012 films
American musical comedy films
American teen comedy films
American teen musical films
American comedy television films
Canadian musical comedy films
Canadian teen comedy films
Canadian comedy television films
English-language Canadian films
Films about orphans
Films based on Cinderella
Films directed by Bille Woodruff
Films set in New York City
Films shot in Vancouver
Musical television films
Nickelodeon original films
2010s American films
2010s Canadian films